The Rave Master manga and anime series features an extensive cast of characters created by Hiro Mashima. The series takes place in a fictional universe that exists as a parallel world where vast numbers of humans, as well as species known as sentenoids and demonoids fight using weapons, magic and evil artifacts known as Dark Bring (Shadow Stone in the anime's English dub). One of the most primary users of the artifact known as Dark Bring is an evil terrorist organization known as Demon Card (Shadow Guard in the anime's English dub) which plans to use it to take over the world and bring it into darkness.

The main character Haru Glory, is chosen by the holy artifact known as Rave to wield the Ten Powers and go on a quest with the strange dog like creature known as Plue to find the other four remaining Rave stones and put an end to the usage of Dark Bring and bring peace to the world. In his travel, fate brings him to ally himself with a girl that lost her memories and believes she is named Elie and is unaware that she has a strong involvement with the Rave stones. Together on their quest, they gain allies known as the Rave Warriors which consist of the thief that can manipulate silver known as Hamrio Musica, a cartographer which is the strange blue creature known as Griffon Katou, Let Dahaka and Julia who are both martial artists and members of a species from the mystic realm known as the Dragon Race, Ruby, a rich penguin-like sentenoid, and Belnika, a kind sorceress.

Creation and design

When making the series Mashima wants to make justice prevail but also make readers understand the villains' reasons to fight the main character in order to make them more complex characters.

Protagonists
The main characters are known as the Rave Warriors.

Haru Glory

 is the main protagonist of the series and the current Rave Master, never giving up in a fight and willing to protect others in spite of the circumstances. Born on Garage Island, Haru was left in the care of his older sister after their mother died some time after their father left to find the Rave Stones. By chance, Haru fished Plue out of the ocean and met the previous Rave Master Shiba, who realizes the youth to be his successor. After realizing the threat that the Demon Card organization pose to the world, Haru promises Shiba that he will find the Rave Stone and stop the Demon Card's evil with Plue by his side. Along the way, he is joined by allies, each having their own goals, yet they were bound together thanks to him and helping each other along the way. He is very friendly and has a lot of energy. He is very protective of Elie, and does anything he can to ensure her safety. Haru also shows to develop a romantic interest in Elie progressively throughout the series, as it also becomes apparent in later chapters that among Haru's greatest motivations to keep fighting onward is in fact for Elie. At the end of the manga, they marry and then had a son.

As the Rave Master, Haru carries a special sword called the Ten Commandments or TCM, (or the Ten Powers in the English dub) that can change from its Eisenmeteor form to nine other forms once the Rave Stones are embedded into it. During the finale, it was found that Haru cannot use the last sword because the sword was originally forged for Shiba. This encourages Musica to forge Haru his own sword, where it becomes the tenth sword called Ravelt, and it later becomes the default form. His old sword was destroyed by Galein Musica to test the new sword.

Elie
 is a mysterious girl with amnesia, who uses tonfa-blasters as her main weapon of choice. After being saved by Haru in Georco, she travels with him in order to regain her memory. A lively, bubbly girl, she has a hot temper and an undying love for casinos, often procuring funds for the group through this method. It is later revealed that Elie harnesses the power of Etherion, an extremely destructive magic that transcends space and time. After traveling to the past, Elie discovers that she is in fact Resha Valentine, and had actually faked her death by encasing herself in magic to later awaken in the future. Following this revelation, Elie recovers Resha’s old staff and equips it in battle, which grants her the ability to summon and destroy Endless. Over the course of the story, Elie starts to develop romantic feelings for Haru, just as Haru does for her; this led to them getting married and the birth of their son at the end of the series. In the anime, she is voiced by Ayako Kawasumi in Japanese and Michelle Ruff in English. Elie was ranked as #20 in a survey conducted by Newtype Japan for Favorite Anime Heroine in 2002.

Plue

Despite his strange appearance, resembling a shivering snowman with a carrot nose despite being called a dog,  is the Rave Bearer and is able to sense the presence of the other Rave Stones. Plue's nose also has the ability to destroy Dark Bring. Plue is quite fond of sweets, especially lollipops, yet hates pudding. He also likes wine, and spiders. He has the ability to use the Rave of Combat, which powers himself and Haru up. It is a running gag in the manga that no one is entirely sure what Plue is or even whether he is male. Most people think of him as a dinosaur, while Elie refers to him as a bug. Haru first names him "Sabutaro" which Let prefers to call him.

Plue made his debut in Mashima's 1998 one-shot Magician. In his series Fairy Tail, Plue is revised as a  celestial spirit who serves as a pet for Lucy Heartfilia. In chapter 71 of Fairy Tail, Happy pulls a prank on Lucy by speaking as if he were Plue. He says he is a servant of a great hero with a sacred stone, referring to Haru. Plue has appeared in works by other authors. In chapter 22 of Air Gear, Ikki pretends to be Plue, even growing the nose. In Pastel, Mugi gives Yuu a Plue doll.

Hamrio Musica
 originally leader of a band of thieves named Silver-Rhythm, Musica joins Haru on his journey and eventually becomes his best and strongest friend. Being a "Silver-Claimer", he can manipulate any silver object (such as the silver skull around his neck) into any form or weapon he wants, making him a weapon master. Later on, Muscica's necklace fuses with Reina's purifyed Dark Bring, White Kiss, after she dies and becomes the weapon known as "Silver Ray". He later forges Haru the holy sword, "Ravelt" (derived from "Rave" and "Welt", the German word for "World") to use in the final battle.

When he was young, Musica's family was wiped out by Lance of the "Beast Sword", a member of Demon Card with a sword forged by his grandfather, Galein Musica. He was then taken in by Rize, a silver-claimer, who raised and taught him in the ways of silver-claiming. On Rize's deathbed, he asked Musica to find Silver Ray and destroy it, to which Musica agreed. Musica later discovered that the Oni Fortress, "River Saly", was actually Silver Ray in disguise. After a battle with the oni leader, Ogre, Muscia managed to destroy the Silver Ray with the help of Reina. The weapon was then reborn as an artifact, which Reina called the "Ocean-Rending Spear, Silver Ray". Musica now carries both the Silver Ray and Reina's silver, as they have fused with his own. In the anime, he is voiced by Showtaro Morikubo in Japanese and Doug Erholtz in English

Griffon Kato
, more commonly called  for short, is a strange small blue creature who mostly praises Plue and calls him 'Master Plue'. Griff has limited shape-shifting abilities, such as inflating portions of his body and elongating his limbs. He is also a voyeuristic character and can be often seen spying on Elie. He is the cartographer of the group. He has a strange horse-like creature named  which he rides and is always seen constantly moving its head side to side in a rapid form.

A Griff-like character and a female Griff-like character can be seen in Fairy Tail Chapter 1, page 20 and Chapter 102, page 02. In the anime, he is voiced by Katsuya Shiga in Japanese and Tom Kenny in English.

Let Dahaka
 is a member of the Dragon Race, a race of dragon people who reside in the Mystic Realm. When Let was first introduced, he was an evil warrior who worked for Demon Card as a guardian for King. He only wanted to fight until Haru defeated him and showed him the path of justice. His initial appearance in the story is of a human with a lizard like face. In the fight against Jegan, he performs Dragon trial and takes the appearance of a human. Soon after, he joined Haru in hope of bringing peace to the world. He uses Dragon Roar of the Gods to defeat Jegan, which consumes one's life in return for the power. He manages to defeat Jegan and turn Julia back to normal using a potion given by Alice. He is saved by Julia who kisses him with the potion in her mouth. In chapter 281, he is revealed to be the king of the Dragon Race, . During the fight against the Demon Card member Uta, Let turns into this form in order to kill him, but he dies in the process. He is revived by Star Memory at the end. In the anime, he is voiced by Takehiro Murozono in Japanese and Doug Stone in English.

Ruby
 is a pink penguin sentinoid who owns a massive floating casino. Ruby likes to use his wealth to buy rare treasures. When he learns Doryu is using his cash for evil ends, he is almost killed by Doryu, but Haru saves him, and he decides to join his side. He is the only person to know who would be the third Rave Master if Haru dies. Ruby also has a tendency to blab out plans that the Rave Warriors have decided on during battle, making them entirely useless. He recently learned how to use "Wind" magic from the bell given to him by his father, . The bell was actually named "the Holy Bell" and it was a weapon used by Dalmatian of the Knights of the Blue Sky. It can turn into a magic sword, and use "Magic Reflection", "Twister", and "Air Ball" (from the videogame). In Chapter 75 the characters of Fairy Tail go to casino owned by Ruby. In the anime, he is voiced by Yukiji in Japanese and Bob Glouberman in English.

Julia
 is Let's girlfriend and fellow member of the Dragon Race. Having failed to pass the dragon trial, Julia was transformed into a dragon and tamed by Jegan of the Oracion Seis. She is saved by Let and turned back to normal using a potion given by Alice. Acting as a sisterly figure to the Rave Warriors, Julia is shown to be rowdy, violent, and somewhat of an exhibitionist. Her appearance gradually changes since her debut after Let saved her, from having a short hair to long wavy hair. She is voiced by Kyoko Namikawa in Japanese.

Belnika
 is a kind girl with a shy personality. She was experimented on in an attempt to instill the power of Etherion within her. Having initially aligned herself with Blue Guardian, she was manipulated by Hardner into believing his plan would eliminate Endless. After discovering Hardner's true intentions, Belnika joins the Rave Warriors. However, it is later revealed that she never attained the power of Etherion, although she does possess a vast amount of magical power. She has the power to heal and also to negate any magic around her. She heals Haru's arm which was in a bad condition due to the effects of Sacrifar. Belnika is intensely loyal to Haru, who she seems to harbor feelings for, although she does not disrupt his relationship with Elie. She later dies from over use of magic during the fight against the Demon Card member, Jiero. She eventually comes back to life due to Star Memory.

Supporting Characters

Kingdom of Symphonia

Shiba Roses
 is the first Rave Master. He acknowledged Haru as the second Rave Master when Rave chose Haru and tasked Haru with the responsibility of bringing peace to the world by gathering all the Raves. As a final test to see if Haru is worthy of being the Rave Master, Shiba challenges him to a battle, reverting to his younger, more powerful self after drinking a special elixir. Only being able to sustain his younger body for 15 minutes, Shiba fought knowing that if he drank the elixir, he'd surely perish. Shiba, however, died happy in Elie's arms having recognized her as Resha, his "lost" and only love. In the battle, Shiba said that he's devoted himself to the world for over 50 years which amazes Haru, who had only been the Rave Master for 2 years. In his time as Rave Master, he was known as the Sword Saint for his mastery of the sword. He is the original wielder and true master of the TCM; hence he could use all ten swords, including the self-harming ninth sword without succumbing to it as well as the original tenth sword Star Raver, while Haru couldn't even master the ninth and needed a new sword as his tenth sword.

Shiba is voiced by Tomomichi Nishimura in the anime, with Kouichi Toochika portraying a younger Shiba. Alan Shearman voices Shiba in the English dub, while Steven Blum portrays his younger self.

Galein Musica
 is Hamrio Musica's grandfather and the blacksmith who created the TCM during Symphonia’s wars. He is renowned as the world's best blacksmith, although at the time of creating the TCM, he was only the continent's best.

Malakia Glory
 is the deceased King of the former Symphonian Kingdom and father to Gale Glory and Grandfather of Haru. He is later tortured to death due to the curse placed on him by Shakuma.

Knights of the Blue Sky
The  are the four strongest fighters of Symphonia that assisted Shiba during the war and died. Later they became the Guardians of the Rave stones.  is a huge brute of a warrior who seems to laugh at everything and uses a giant battle axe. After his death he transformed into a bear, guarding the Rave of Knowledge and the graveyard of the warriors who fought for Symphonia.  is a dark-skinned female warrior who uses two giant knives. After death her soul was joined with an eagle and became the guardian of the Rave of Combat. Master  is a master tactician who is almost always seen smoking a pipe. After death he borrowed the body of a walrus and became the guardian of the Rave of Destiny. He was also the original owner of the sword, Holy Bell, which is owned by Ruby in the present.  is the leader of the Knights of the Blue Sky and the only one of the four who survived the war and Overdrive. He was the one that kept the other knights' souls in the borrowed bodies of animals. He guards the Rave of Truth and was the steward for Haru's final test to be the true Rave Master. He is also the most charismatic and strongest of the four and his weapon of choice is a spear. All four of the knights surnames seems to be inspired by dog breeds.

Mildian

Sieg Hart
 is a 27-year-old elemental master and most powerful sorcerer from Mildian. Obsessed with upholding the time stream, he initially infiltrated Demon Card with the intention of eliminating King, and later attempts to kill Elie in order to erase the threat of Etherion. However, he later realizes that Elie’s power can save the world, and aligns himself with the Rave Warriors in order to protect her. After he, Haru, and Elie are sent back 50 years in time, Sieg remains in the past in order to return the two to the present. He dies guarding Resha Valentine’s grave, with Haru and Elie identifying his skeleton five decades later. Sieg Hart is voiced by Masami Kikuchi in the anime, and by Crispin Freeman in the English dub.

In Mashima's later work, Fairy Tail, Sieg Hart's character design was reused as the character Jellal Fernandez, who was first introduced under the alias of Siegrain being a reference to Sieg Hart.

Miltz
 is the village head of Mildian, with power considered second only to Sieg Hart. Widely respected by the citizens of Mildian, Miltz initially ran the village as a dictatorship, strictly punishing those who disobeyed the laws of time. He aligned himself with Haja of the Oracion Seis in order to obtain Star Memory, turning the village against Sieg as a result of his failure to eliminate Elie. However, after learning of Haja’s loyalty to Demon Card, Miltz assists Sieg in the battle against him, later reforming Mildian values at Niebel’s urging.

Niebel
 is a young mage from the village of Mildian who idolizes Sieg Hart. He is first introduced as an adolescent sorcerer specializing in illusion magic, and has stated that he was not born in Mildian. Prior to his debut, Niebel had protested Miltz’s morally questionable actions, and as a result was a wanted fugitive until the years leading up to Sieg’s return. He is later reaccepted into the village after the battle with Haja. It is stated by Sieg that Niebel has the potential to surpass his abilities. This theoretical power is shown during the battle against Jiero, when he uses a spell that gives him unlimited magical power, but rapidly ages him. This stalls Jiero long enough for Julia to kill her, but results in his death from old age. He is later revived by Star Memory.

Garage Island

Gale Glory
 is the father of Haru and Cattleya. He is related to the first king of Symphonia, Gale "Symphonia" Glory I, who was his great-grandfather. Gale had an enchanted sword called the "Azure Sky Blade" or the "Sapphire Symphonia Sword". Gale was a former Shadow Guard or Demon Card leader. King (Gale Raregroove) was his best friend, but King obtained a shadow stone and went out of control. Glory quit Demon Card and became an Imperial. Unfortunately, King became angry with him, believing he was responsible for the death of his family, and killed Sakura, Gale's wife and Queen of Symphonia. He also slashed Gale's face and sealed a Shadow Stone inside of the newly created scar. Gale resolved to take revenge on King, and so as not to endanger the lives of his children, he never returned home. He reunites with Haru in the Tower of Din and helps him defeat King. Gale died after he protected Haru from falling rocks.

Cattleya Glory
 is Haru's older sister, and the self-proclaimed "Queen of "Karaoke". Since their parents were away, she had to take over in raising Haru on Garage Island.  Although reluctant to let Haru leave, she eventually gives her consent. Haru often quotes things he should not do because his sister said so. She is revealed to be in a relationship with Shuda. After Haru’s return, she welcomes him and Elie home and attends their wedding. In the anime she is voiced by Satsuki Yukino in Japanese and Cindy Robinson in English.

Branch
 is Cattleya's ex-boyfriend who was abusive and beat her. He encountered Haru while preparing to enter a local dance competition with Nagisa (who was under the name of Mika). He is later turned into a cyborg by the Blue Guardians. After being strongly hated by Haru for his acts in the past, they get along moments before he dies from a bomb planted by the Blue Guardians.

Shuda
Voiced by: Toshihiko Seki|English dub: Crispin Freeman
 is the first member of Demon Card's Oracion Six to be introduced. He fought and lost to Haru Glory twice in the beginning of the series, and after his second defeat, he reforms and becomes an ally of Haru and his friends.  He holds the utmost respect for Gale Glory.  He uses the high six star Dark Bring Ballettänzer Zeffrea, which allows him to cause an explosion within a spherical targeting grid that manifests over a chosen point in space; it is later destroyed by Lucia.  He also wields two swords: the ghost sword Entenka (which spews forth flames by cutting the wind), and the divine sword Heavenly Blossom, which is claimed to be a weapon of the gods. Shuda also is revealed to have a relationship with Haru's sister.

Solasido and Remi Sharpner
Musica develops an attraction towards Remi, much to Solasido's displeasure. Both of them, along with  one of the cities warriors, assisted the Rave Warriors during the battle at the Tower of Din. Solasido is voiced by Kenji Nojima in Japanese and Ping Wu in English, and Remi is voiced by Moyu Arishima in Japanese and Kari Wahlgren.

Celia
 is a beautiful young mermaid with long blue hair. She is the younger sister of the Queen of the underwater mermaid village, Mildesta. She falls deeply in love with Haru, much to Elie's displeasure. She is capable of using "Sea Magic" which is strong in water and can do things such as giving people the ability to breathe underwater for a limited time and can even take the form of a human on land for a certain amount of time. She teams up with the Rave Warriors for a short time to help stop the Onigami Forces and Doryu Ghost Squad who were terrorizing her people. She's voiced by Ryōka Yuzuki in some video games.

Alice
 the elixir maker is a medicine man met by Haru's gang during the journey to Southernberg island. He says "munya" a lot. Although simple-minded in appearance, usually wearing a bunny eared hat and a loincloth, he is over five hundred years old and 'wields' a giant syringe, containing various fluids, of which switched the souls of Haru, Elie, Musica and Plue around, causing confusion. Alice later cured Elie's broken arm. Due to his age, he has potions with almost unbelievable effects such as enlarging a random part of a person (he used this as a gag), curing almost any wound and restoring a person to his/her true form. He also has a potion for restoring youth, in exchange for a portion of the drinker's remaining days. He was also a former classmate of Mummy of the Doryu Ghost Squad who he domineered over.

Saga Pendragon
 is a prophet of Acapella Island, belonging to Nakajima's race. His poi was stolen by a tiny dandelion named "Dee Dee". He can communicate with Haru and Co. through the power of the fourth rave. He was also the one to predict the appearance of Endless which caused Resha to fake her death so that she could fight it in the present day. In the past he was in human form and at the end of the series he is once again human (no explanation is given as to why or how). He has a maid named  who knows a lot about flowers and is very talkative who has also human in the past as well.

Liberation Army
Their base of operations is an airship known as the Liberale Familia. Yuma's two best members are Mitsu and Nanahoshi are second-in-command during his absence and another member named Chaddock is the acting captain during their absence.

Minor Characters

Arcela Raregroove
 was the last survivor of humanity in the original timeline. Using Star Memory, she altered history in order to reverse the fate of mankind, although this resulted in the birth of Endless. Her actions supposedly cursed the Raregroove bloodline.

Bony the Starfish
 the Starfish is a talking starfish who followed the Rave Warriors after leaving Southernburg. He is often eaten and vomited by Lazenby.

Chino
 is a boy from Ska Village who blamed the constant raining caused by Go & Rosa on frogs and tried hurting them. His mother  runs the hotel in Ska Village. An older version of him appears later on in one of the Rave 0077 mini chapters.

Evermary
 is an elder who resided at the Star Vestige who likes eating apples. He was Gale Glory's adoptive father.

Feber
 is probably the weakest enemy ever mentioned by his name. He was the first Demon Card soldier Haru fought. He badly injured Shiba with a bazooka in Volume 1, but Haru punched him with the Rave and defeated him. Shuda later gave him the Dark Bring "Full Metal", which enabled him to turn his skin into metal. He went after Haru again, and was again defeated with the Explosion form of Ten Powers Sword. It is possible Gemma later hired him in Cafe Tsubomi.

Genma
 is the owner of Cafe Tsubomi on Garage Island. He is good friends with Gale and the rest of the Glory family and has a habit of constant laughing. His parents were Shiba's good friends.

Georco
 is the president of the dog racing track in Hip Hop Town, Georco possesses the Dark Bring Smoke Bay, enabling him to turn his body into smoke, and create a cloud of suffocating, carbon monoxide. Haru was almost defeated by him in volume 2, but was defeated after Plue somehow managed to take his DB. In the manga, he is defeated the first Rave stone, but in the anime; it is the Ten Powers's first form. In the anime, it is hinted that Shuda had him killed after his defeat.

Go and Rosa
Go is a movie director who uses a hammer combined with a Dark Bring that controls thunder. Rosa is an actress who uses a "Hunter Wolf" as a weapon which is a detachable sword that seeks their enemy and has a Dark Bring that makes men dance uncontrollably. Both of them appear as during the final battle to help the Rave Warriors reach the star memory. In the Rave 0077 mini chapters it is revealed that they have a future daughter named  who is Levin Glory's romantic interest.

Hebi
Voiced by: Kousuke Okano (English dub: Nicholas Guest)
 is Musica's right-hand man and second in command of the Silver-Rhythm gang which are a motley crew of thieves and brigands, but are nonetheless loyal to Musica. He and the rest of the Silver-Rhythm gang occasionally join and help out Haru's group with their state-of-the-art air ship, the "Silver Knights" gained from ill-gotten wealth. He also knows a lot about animals. However, when questioned as to what Plue was, he was clueless and turned away. He has a tattoo on his head that says "snake". Hebi and the rest of the gang appear during the final fight to assist Haru and gang in reaching the Star Memory.

Jeid
 is one of the four main generals in the Imperial Army and the older brother of Jegan of the Oracion Six. He convinces Jegan to live the right way, and is distraught when the village they inhabit is destroyed and Jegan is killed attempting to protect the woman who saved him after his and Let's fight. With that, he resolves to destroy Demon Card. From there, Jeid is not seen until just before the last battle is begun, right before the story ends.

Jellybone
 is a doctor who was the only person close to Belnika prior to meeting the Rave Warriors and looked after her during her Etherion experiments. After Hardner revealed his evil intentions to Belnika, he was used as a hostage to get Belnika to cooperate with his plans.

Jiggle Butt Gang
 are three hopeless robbers who have absolutely no talent in robbing, they have comically large behinds which they jiggle when excited. Their leader, named , has an affinity with Plue. In Fairy Tail the anime series the Jiggle Butt Gang make appearances in the filler "Key of the Starry Sky arc". They also make a cameo appearance in Episode 37 of the anime series GetBackers without their trademark skintight suits and big butts as they wore Hawaiian collared suits and they are chasing Natsumi as a retrieval expert before they are later subdued by Kazuki Fuchouin with his strings to save Natsumi.

Lance
 is Commander of the 17th unit of Demon Card soldiers, he wields the Beast Sword, forged by Galein Musica. It allows him to create illusions at his will. His DB allows him to make his illusions real. Somewhat of a psychopath, he captured Elie and injured Hamrio Musica in volume 2, and was defeated by Haru in Volume 3. He was also responsible for killing off Musica's family.

Lazenby
 the White Flame was formerly a misdirected member of Imperial Guardians for Deep Snow. He wears a superhero mask and an accessory that makes him appear to have four arms and resembles the bulkiness of your average superhero. He supports justice to his highest extent capable. When it comes to abilities, he can perform many white flame techniques and special punch moves. After being defeated by Shuda, he finds out that he was misguided by Demon Card to think the Rave Master is evil and becomes a comic ally to the Rave Warriors.

Levin Glory
 is the future son of Haru and Elie who looks a lot like them, he is featured in the Rave 0077 mini chapters of the manga. He is constantly left home alone and is seen doing most of his ridiculous antics with his babysitter Nakajima.

Nakajima
Voiced by: Kousuke Okano (English dub: Randall Montgomery)
 is a strange lifeform that lives stuck to the outside wall of Cattleya and Haru's house. He looks like a flower, but claims that the petal-looking things ringing his round face are feathers. His favorite (and perhaps only) hobby is "golling".

Range and Sopra
They later leave Demon Card and appear with many of the other Rave Warriors allies to help them get to Star Memory.

Rize
 is the man who taught Hamrio Musica Sliver-claiming. He was originally going to steal the Silver Ray because it was too dangerous to fall in the wrong hands but failed as someone already stole it before him. On his way back, he found and took Musica in after the rest of family was slaughtered by Lance. Before he died from natural causes, Rize had Musica promise to destroy Silver Ray should he ever find it.

Roppen
 is a former Symphonian soldier who was under the command of Alpine. He wore leopard print armor. In the present his spirit lives in a leopard form and stays with Alpine at the shrine of the Rave of Truth.

Sakura Glory
 is the wife of Gale Glory and mother of Haru and Cattleya. After Gale departed from Garage Island to put an end to Demon Card, Sakura pursued him for one year before encountering him in a confrontation with King. However, she was murdered by the latter in front of her husband, as revenge for the deaths of his wife and child.

Unicorn Watanabe
 called  for short is a cook that formerly worked for the Onigami Forces. He seems to be a member of the same race as Griff but has a horn on his head that is identical to Plue's nose. He believes to be the identical twin to Plue because of it despite resembling Griff more. He accompanies the Rave warriors while they fight the Onigami Forces and Doryu and decides to stay with the mermaids after Doryu's defeat.

Antagonists

Demon Card

Gale Raregroove
He founded Demon Card with Gale but after Gale left from their conflicting bloodlines, King became the sole leader of Demon Card, and soon fell under the influence of Dark Bring, whose power he used to strengthen the organization which later after 10 years, the organization became a force for evil that terrorized the world with the power of Dark Bring. Years later King is reported to the empire by Gale which causes his intentions misread and instead the empire commences a slaughter upon the forces of Demon Card, killing King's wife Emilia and presumably his son Lucia. King himself was taken into custody by the Empire but later broke out with the power of Dark Bring. In the present, Haru and Gale Glory fight King at the Tower of Din where the battle ends with King dying and Gale Glory dying in the aftermath of the fight. King is extremely strong and is often used as a reference to show the relative strength of other villains. Although he uses 5 dark bring, which is considered an extraordinary feat, he does not use any Sinclaire like the other main villains of the series. The fact he can still match them in combat is a testament to his strength. King's sword Decalogus is a dark bring which is the evil counterpart of the TCM. His Dark Bring, Black Zenith fires a huge black sphere that disintegrates anything that it touches. The Dark Bring, Gate which can open doors between worlds. King used this to summon his warriors, the 5 Palace Guardians, from the Mystic realm. Monster Prison is one of the "reverse" Dark Brings feared for their unchecked power, which seals the bearer's body and soul within it for all eternity, transforming them into a beast with just bestial instincts; in this form, he is immune to pain and can fire energy beams from the mouth. The last Dark Bring he possess is Warp Road which has the power of teleportation which King used to extract the Dark Bring End of Earth from within Gale and teleport it to the distant Demon Card HQ, which was annihilated in the subsequent Overdrive. In the anime he is voiced by Tesshō Genda in Japanese and Peter Lurie in English.

Lucia Raregroove
 is the primary antagonist of the series. He is the son of King and was the heir to the throne of Demon Card and also the Raregroove Kingdom. During the Empire's infamous raid of Demon Card headquarters 10 years prior to the series present, Lucia was presumably killed in the slaughter along with his mother, Emilia. When he was seen to still be alive, he was imprisoned within the 66th basement of the maximum security desert prison Mega Unit where he became an infamous legend known among the Empire as the Blonde Demon, a boy whose power was so great and terrifying, he was a threat to the entire world. Sometime after the death of his father during the battle at the Tower of Din, he became powerful enough to violently break out of his imprisonment within Mega Unit. Much like Gale Glory and King were destined to oppose each other, Lucia is every bit the antithesis to the second Rave Master Haru Glory, as the self-proclaimed Dark Bring Master. Initially, he possessed Sinclair, the first piece of Endless (The mother of all Dark Brings), that was the main piece which has the power of creating  a warped dimensional space that has enough pressure to annihilate anything. After having over 10 years of influence over him, Sinclair managed to bestow upon Lucia a high amount of superhuman strength, speed, stamina, endurance and durability as well as giving him knowledge. He also wields his father's former sword, Decalogue which has the same abilities as Haru's TCM. Although it was later destroyed by Haru and he received an enhanced version of it called Neo Decalogue where 10 dark brings were used to enhanced all 10 swords. In the anime he is voiced by Souichiro Hoshi in Japanese and Armando Valdes-Kennedy in English.

Shakuma
 was the master of Haja, and he is said to be the most powerful mage on the entire planet. He was recruited by Lucia to kidnap Elie and make her Lucia's bride. He was also the one who murdered the King of Symphonia, Haru's grandfather, in the past. He possessed high magical prowess, easily destroying a city with a high-level spell, killing all of its inhabitants (including the newly reformed Jegan) in search of Ogre's piece of the Sinclaire. While undoubtedly powerful, he was still defeated by the power of Elie's Etherion. Before his death, he laughs as he believes his grandson will rule all of time, then he melts into a puddle. He had a solemn serious personality until after Elie hit him, when he reverted to a sadistic, disgusting old man.

Oracion Six
The  are the six most powerful warriors and leaders in Demon Card. Shuda was originally one of the Oracion Six but after his defeat by Haru, he was replaced by Deep Snow. Quite possibly the Oracion Six' defining attribute, this set of special Dark Brings are considered to be the most powerful in the world, second only perhaps to the five pieces of the mother of all Dark Brings, Sinclair (which caused the Overdrive 50 years ago). The Six Star Dark Brings enable each member of the Oracion Six to bend a force of nature to their will. In Fairy Tail, the same concept was used to describe a dark guild comprises six powerful mages.

Haja
 is the de facto leader of the Oracion Six and one of its most powerful members (second only to Berial, according to the author). He is one of the top mages in the world, second only perhaps to his master Shakuma (the world's greatest mage). His overwhelming might is primarily attributed to his ability to generate limitless quantities of mana, which gained him the title of "Haja the Infinite"; while this was seemingly a natural ability at first, it was later revealed to be derived from a Dark Bring implanted within him. Like the archmage Sieghart, he hails from the town of Mildian, the city of time. He was initially depicted as being one of Demon Card's most loyal members, but later events would later reveal him to be a highly devious and ambitious individual, who plotted to have the most powerful forces for both good AND evil eliminated and coveted ultimate power to achieve control over the entire world and all of time. To that end, he returned to his hometown of Mildian to acquire the great power that dwelled beneath it, super magic Cronus, but was opposed and inevitably killed by Sieg, who was aided by the people of Mildian. It was revealed afterwards that Haja carried within him the essence of the Demon Card scientist Igor Kilkila, who was released after Haja was killed (Igor was subsequently defeated and imprisoned by Sieg and the people of Mildian).

Reina
 is a Silver Claimer, like Musica. She became a member of Demon Card and the Oracion Six to avenge the injustice done to her deceased father, as well as to find the silver ship Silver Ray (her father's greatest work), whose theft her father was unjustly accused of. She has an issue with Musica, as his mentor Rize is who Reina believes to be the true culprit behind the theft of the Silver Ray, and hence is privy to its location. She uses the Six Star Dark Bring White Kiss, which she uses to create silver out of thin air, which she then manipulates to create silver weapons. In the battle against Ogre she teams up with Musica to defeat him. In this battle they use the Silver Bonds to defeat Ogre. She liked Musica and told him how she felt before destroying the Silver Ray. At the last moment, Reina pushed Musica off the Silver Ray and used Silver Bonds, causing an explosion in the sky. She died but her silver combined with Musica's and her soul slipped inside Musica's silver ray spear, which fell out of the heavens.

Jegan
 is a member of the Dragon Race in the Demon World, and the younger brother of Empire's Western General Jade. He is involved in a bitter feud with his former friend Let, because of Jegan's destruction of their home village and the massacre of their kind, in particular Julia, Let's girlfriend. In reality, however, Jegan faked Julia's death, and she became a full dragon who serves as his mindless companion and steed, after she purposely failed her dragon trial to spite him. He uses the "tree" Six Star Dark Bring Yggdrasil, which can absorb energy and manipulate plant life.

After his final battle and defeat at the hands of Let, Jegan realized that Julia still chose Let over him. Jegan would wash up in the beach of Wrist Dome, the Roofed City. He was found and then cared for by a girl named Janna, but a desperate Jegan (feeling he has nothing more to live for) is determined to die. However, a conversation with his brother Jade, the Empire's Western General, caused him to rethink his decision and instead begin anew. Unfortunately, this was not to last, as the city is soon bombarded by meteors from space, courtesy of Shakuma (the world's mightiest sorcerer) and his apprentice Haja, who were out to retrieve the Sinclaire piece Last Physics (which also washed up into the city) and to eliminate Jegan for his failure and weakness. Jegan dies trying in vain to save Janna from the meteor shower, much to his brother Jade's grief and outrage.

Berial
 is an archduke in the Demon World. A four-eyed demonic bat named Boi Boi often sits on his shoulder. He was the one who proposed to the Great Demon Lord Megido of the Lava and his peers for them to ally with Demon Card, as part of the organization's ambitious Project: Dark Rendezvous. He uses the Six Star Dark Bring G-Earth, which allows him to manipulate the ground. He appears again after The Blue Guardians are defeated and sends an army of monsters to kill Haru and his friends after Haru had retrieved the final RAVE. Haru kills him with a single hit. This is surprising because the author's notes define him as the strongest.

Iulius
 is an extremely vain individual, obsessed with beauty. He is arguably the weakest member of the Oracion Six, but can be considered dangerous in certain instances, particularly if his own beauty is threatened. Like Shuda, he was a villain in the beginning, but he was reformed (to a certain extent) and became an ally of Haru Glory and his friends. He loves dancing and (his own) beauty to the point that he's willing to betray Demon Card for them.

Deep Snow
 is the Northern General of the Empire, but is in reality a double-agent working for Demon Card. He returned to the organization when Lucia became its new ruler, and was chosen as Shuda's replacement within the Oracion Six. He uses the "flow" Six Star Dark Bring Zero Stream, which allows him to control all that flows (water, wind, blood, etc.), and has also the Dark Bring Type 56 implanted within him when he was an infant, allowing him to tap into his latent power and enhance his physical abilities. He engages in an intense duel with Shuda but loses; however, Shuda lets him live and reveals that King had acted out of compassion for him, treating him like a son just as Snow had looked up to him like a father. His fate after the battle remains unknown.

Imperial Guardians
The  are a set of four individuals that have served the late Imperial Headquarters. After the Imperial Headquarters was completely wiped out by Demon Card, these four imperial guardians joined Demon Card truly under Deep Snow because they had nothing better to do.
 the Chrysalis also known to be the weakest of the four is an insect like creature that has a body completely covered with armor. Dalton is usually seen flying due to his wings, and specializes in forming varied traps via his spider web like techniques.  the Full Moon is a human who possesses extraordinary abilities with the chakram, which is the reason for his title. When it comes to appearance, Moore is seen wearing a hat that possesses many outer eyes and an overall clownish like garb. Golden-eye  who is easily seen as the largest of the four is a large monster like human that is seen wearing a giant suit of knight armor over his body and long golden hair who wields a great sword. Lazenby the White Flame was initially one of them and misdirected by Demon Card as well but after being knocked out ends up assisting the Rave Warriors for a while as a comedic ally.

Each of the Guardians is named after an actor who has portrayed James Bond on screen: Timothy Dalton, Roger Moore (who starred in Moonraker), Pierce Brosnan (who starred in GoldenEye), and George Lazenby.

Four Great Demon Lords
In a way, these four are the incarnation of the original demon guard of King, both of which were used to delay the heroes.  is a massive humanoid lion, he was the first to join Lucia during the Dark Rendezvous recruiting process due to his desire to gain more power. He drives a flying coach, and breathes massive blasts of fire capable of damaging even Endless. He kills himself after being mortally wounded by Shuda, thinking that he'll take Shuda with him.  also known as Jiero of Despair is a Demon Goddess resembling a scantily-clad woman, and also said to be the former queen of the makai world. While human in appearance, her body is made of ice, allowing her to regenerate herself, and she controls magic and despair which somewhat fuels. She is killed by the combined effort of Julia, Belinka, and Niebel. This however results in the deaths of Niebel and Belinka, who are later revived by the Memory of the Star.  also called "Uta the Eternal", is a Demon War God used to defend Lucia as he prepared the second Overdrive. He was a human-like demon who possessed inhuman strength, wielding a hundred-foot longsword with incredible ease. He has a second form where 2 horns grow from his head, giving him increased combat abilities. He is killed by Let turning into his true Dragon King form, killing himself in the process before the Memory of the Star revives him as well.  also known as Asura of Darkness, while normally small and implike, it is merely to conceal his true form which is a gargantuan Satanic demon with a countless amount of Dark Bring embedded into its body. He has the ability to use any Dark Bring in the world and also can combine Dark Bring to produce effects. He is killed by the combined efforts of Plue and Haru.

Endless
, also known as the King of Star Memory, is a monstrous entity born as the result of the alternate timeline, in which history was reconstructed to ensure the survival of mankind. Endless gains power through the accumulation of negative emotions, making its growth virtually unstoppable. Its infinite power is capable of eradicating dimensions. However, it can be destroyed by the power of Etherion, and summoned by the staff of Resha Valentine or assembling of the five Sinclaires. Endless is later revealed to be a dark bring itself, or the true origin of all dark brings, with its real appearance being a black orb made from the five Mother Dark Brings. Endless is used by Lucia Raregroove in an attempt to restore the original timeline, but is ultimately destroyed by Elie’s Etherion.

Five Palace Guardians
The  are five warriors from other dimensions are brought together by one of King's Dark Brings, the Gate. The guard the Tower of Din as well as being non-humans of unparalleled strength. He also has a power unrelated to his Dark Bring that enables him to seal opponents within the landscape of their memories.  is recognizable due to his tallness, long neck, and penchant for speaking in rhyme. Despite these oddities, Rionette is easily the most sadistic of the group; using his Dark Bring, "Shadow Doll", to warp to wherever his opponent's shadow is and render them unable to move by standing on it.   is a yellow demonoid with horseshoe-shaped hair that carries a pair of maracas and is constantly seeking the approval of Ltiangle. He cannot help dancing and his Dark Bring, "Rhythm Counter", allows him to reflect attacks back at the sender but with far greater power. He can also possesses the ability to read the thoughts of others .  is the largest, but also the weakest and dumbest member of the Palace Guardians. Despite being a massive suit of armor, Ron is a coward at heart and fights with underhanded tactics. His main weapons are a huge shield and spear, the latter of which he uses as a medium for his Dark Bring, "Spikes", that allows him to generate metal spikes from directly beneath his opponent(s) feet whenever he stabs the ground. Let Dahaka was initially the second most powerful of the Palace Guardians but, after his defeat to Haru, later changes his ways and becomes a central ally and good friend to the Rave Warriors.

Like several villains leading up to them, their names are in reference to something (or someone) in real life if you add the word "ma" to the beginning of their name. This is also a play on the fact that they're all Majin ("Ma" meaning demon and "jin" denoting a person. Translated as "demonoid" in the English manga). All their names origins are maltiangle (Ltiangle), marionette (Rionette), maracas (Racas), Marron glacé (Ron Glace), and mallet (Let). According to the author, Ltiangle was he was the hardest character to draw in the entire series due to his detailed armor and tower shaped head.

Blue Guardians
The  are an organization of sky pirates who are just as powerful as Demon Card and even forms an alliance with them.  They are led by Captain Hardner and travel in the giant flying ship Albatross and therefore, they have no permanent base. The first mate,  who is exceptionally loyal to Hardner has dark skin and wields an enormous axe. Her Dark Bring allows her to change into Light granting her possibly light speed.

Among the Blue Guardians are their elite force known as  that is said to match Demon Card's Oracion Six. , the leader of the Six Guard has short, dark hair with a symbol tattooed onto his head has some alligator-looking animal skin over his head and a long cape. His Dark Bring allows him to change into acid and burn enemies who come into contact with him, granting him virtual immunity to physical attacks and also wields a scythe shaped like an anchor for armed combat.  is a small koala looking guy with extremely long sleeves who says "yes" at the end of all of his sentences and is also a sadist. He has his Dark Bring hanging around his neck which allows him to create and modify machinery. He has many machine types such that if one gets destroyed it rebuilds into a stronger one. , bears a slight resemblance to Elvis and has a similar haircut and wears giraffe-patterned pants while he also says things like "lame-o" and "daddy-o" like a jazz poet. His Dark Bring allows him to twist any object that he touches, no matter how hard. , the only female member in the Six Guard, bears a slight resemblance to a leopard. Her Dark Bring allows her to wear anything as an armor, including wind which grants her increased speed and agility, bullets, Julia's fire breath, electricity, and metal (which she considers her strongest form and only uses on people she hates). , the largest member is perverted and looks like a large mustachioed bunny with a wrestling outfit. His Dark Bring allows him to blow things away, but it also tears things apart and is incredibly smelly. , the first Blue Guardian to be introduced, and a rather fat member who totes a giant club and has bags under his eyes and wears something that resembles a leaf on his head. His Dark Bring allows him to put people to sleep, leaving them at the mercy of his attacks. He can also put himself to sleep to awaken a fighting technique that makes him even stronger.

Captain Hardner
 is the leader of the Blue Guardians. He was recruited by Iulius for Demon Card's DR (Dark Rendezvous) plan. His Mother DB Anastasia allows him to "restore" anything, including his missing arm, ruined buildings that had long since been leveled, the atmosphere after Haru tried a smoke screen, and all his opponents old wounds which they have ever suffered and is usually fatal (although it appears he has to touch the subject). He also carries a sword with a blunted tip since he prefers to slash off heads instead of stabbing people, thus earning the nickname "Executioner".He aims to merge with Endless, to forget the incident of which killed all of his comrades, wife, and unborn child, which made him and his best friend the only survivors. Unknown to him, his unborn child was alive and raised up by his best friend. Hardner also tried all means to torture his daughter to reveal the hideout of which hid an ancient staff deep underground. Realizing what he had done to his own flesh and blood, Hardner broke down in defeat as Haru spares him, only to be stabbed in the back by Lucia to retrieve the mother DB piece in volume 28. It is later revealed he survived the attack.

Doryu Ghost Squad
The , is a criminal organization led by Pumpkin Doryu consisting of Halloween themed monsters. When Demon Card briefly disbanded after King's defeat, they were one of the several smaller groups that emerged in attempt to take the top spot in the criminal underworld. They become Haru's new nemesis while on his way to Symphonia and later after allying with the Onigami Forces, battle the Rave Warriors at Southernberg. , a Frankenstein-esque member, wields a dark bring, called Giant which allows him to enlarge his arms at will.  is a presumably young woman with a slight resemblance to Medusa and uses the Dark Bring North Wind which enables her to manipulate and become physically one with the wind. It also allows her to breathe in and move freely through large bodies of water. She is exceptionally glib with her tongue and does not hesitate to lie to get her way and Ruby remarked that she always bullied him.  is a corrupt scientist with an affinity for werewolves as he created a breed of bipedal wolves with three eyes and machine guns imbued into their right arms. Mummy also turned the defeated Musica into a powerful lycanthropic creature and sent the beast against the Rave warriors, but Haru returned Musica to his normal state. Mummy also possessed a reversal dark bring, Bone Knight (a dark bring that throws away the wielder's soul to transform them, similar to King's Monster Prison).  was a mass murderer executed by the Empire fifteen years ago because of his crimes but was brought back as a zombie by Doryu's use of Necromancy. His dark bring, All Crush, allowed him to automatically destroy anything that he touches or what touches him.  was the most powerful member of the Doryu Ghost Squad but was killed very quickly by Jegan's Dark Bring, Yggdrasil.

Pumpkin Doryu
 is the founder of the Doryu Ghost Squad and holder of its top position. He holds one of the five mother DB, Vampire, which gives him complete control over the forces of gravity and repulsion which lets him, at the most extreme, pull physical matter into darkness (which he did to Musica). He first fought Haru in Volume 15, and he nearly killed Haru with the Twilight sword. The second time they fought in Volume 17, Haru seemed to have gained some new strength (he might have gotten stronger as a result to losing the first match), and he destroyed the Twilight sword and the Jet Black sword. Haru also received some help from his friends, but it ended up being a one on one fight between Haru and Doryu. Haru was able to overcome the pain of his earlier injuries, destroyed Doryu's most powerful spell (which would have killed Haru and all of his friends), broke through the Vampire's power of repulsion, and he killed Doryu with the Million Suns. After this point, Haru was stronger than Doryu. Haru almost killed himself after he used all his power to defeat Doryu, but he was saved by Dalmatian in Volume 18. He's voiced by Koji Ishii in some video games.

Onigami
 is made up of a large amount of onis (similar to demonoids, but more humanlike) led by Ogre, they sided with the Doryu Ghost Attack Squad to pose a threat to the newly reformed Demon Card. Their leader  is a brutish oni with a notable lust for women. He possesses the Last Physics one of the mother DB which grants him immunity to physical attacks and most magic which operates in the physical dimension. Ogre is also a "Gold-Claimer" which is a more advanced technique then the silver claiming done by Musica and Reina. It was revealed that he was the one whole stole the Silver Ray. Ogre is voiced by Hiroshi Matsumoto in some video games.  is Ogre's right hand Onigami ally and the chief of maintenance and technology. He uses the Sky High dark bring which grants him telekinetic control to any surrounding weapons.  is the Onigami Gunnery Chief who has the "Through the Wall" dark bring which allows him to transport through walls. , the Onigami Chief Engineer who uses the all-seeing Double Vista dark bring which are in the form of glasses and can see through anything.  is the leader over the Onigami Raiding Party who uses the Stone Roses dark bring which turns anything it touches into stone. Initially they had Unicorn Watanabe a cook who is the same species as Griffon Kato, but he joined forces with the Rave Warriors.

References

Characters
Rave Master
Rave Master